DEXA or Dexa may refer to either:

 the steroid Dexamethasone
 the scanning technique Dual-energy X-ray absorptiometry also abbreviated DXA